Shafag-Asiman (Azerbaijani:  Şəfəq və Asiman) is a large complex of offshore geological structures in the Caspian Sea located  southeast of Baku, Azerbaijan. The Shafag and Asiman structures have been previously called D8 and D10, respectively.

History
The memorandum of understanding (MOU) for exploring the Shafag-Asiman structures was signed on July 13, 2009. According to the initial agreement, the offshore block will be jointly developed by BP and State Oil Company of Azerbaijan Republic (SOCAR). The MOU was signed by the President of SOCAR, Rovnag Abdullayev and Chief Executive of Exploration and Production of BP, Andy Inglis in the presence of President of Azerbaijan, Ilham Aliyev and former Prime Minister of the United Kingdom, Gordon Brown. The MOU was followed by signing of Heads of Agreement on basic commercial principles on joint exploration and development of the fields by Rovnag Abdullayev and President of BP Azerbaijan, Rashid Javanshir, on July 6, 2010 during the visit of the President of BP, Tony Hayward, to Azerbaijan. The production sharing agreement for development and exploration of Shafag-Asiman block covers a period of thirty years with potential extension of up to five more years. The first two exploration wells will be drilled within the next four years with possible extension of exploration works for three more years. All costs for exploration works will be covered by BP. Development of the Shafag-Asiman block is considered by some as extension of Azeri-Chirag-Guneshli (ACG) project, operated by BP. Exploration works are expected to start in the second half of 2016 and continue through the second half of 2017.

Reservoir
The initial reserves are estimated to be about 500 billion cubic meters of gas and 65 million tons of condensate. The 2D geophysical surveys previously conducted at block indicate that these deeply laying structures may contain big amounts of gas. The 3D-seismic study in three stages is being carried out by Caspian Geophysical under BP contract. The first phase will be completed in 2011; the second data processing phase in 2012 and the third data interpretation phase in the first half of 2014.

See also

Azeri-Chirag-Guneshli
Shah Deniz gas field
Umid gas field

References

Natural gas fields in Azerbaijan
Energy in the Soviet Union
Caspian Sea
BP oil and gas fields